Southern Thai, also known as  Dambro, Pak Tai, or "Southern language", is a Southwestern Tai ethnolinguistic identity and language spoken in southern Thailand as well as by small communities in the northernmost Malaysian states. It is spoken by roughly five million people, and as a second language by the 1.5 million speakers of Pattani and other ethnic groups such as the local Peranakans communities, Negritos, and other tribal groups. Most speakers are also fluent in or understand the Central Thai dialects.

Classification 

Southern Thai is classified as one of the Chiang Saen languages—others being Thai, Northern Thai and numerous smaller languages, which together with the Northwestern Tai and Lao-Phutai languages, form the Southwestern branch of Tai languages. The Tai languages are a branch of the Kra–Dai language family, which encompasses a large number of indigenous languages spoken in an arc from Hainan and Guangxi south through Laos and Northern Vietnam to the Cambodian border.

Dialects
Phonyarit (2018) recognizes the following nine main dialects of Southern Thai, based on tone split and merger patterns.

Southern Thai (Eastern) 
 Nakhonsithammarat dialect (Standard), spoken in the upper part of Nakhon Si Thammarat Province and southern part of Surat Thani Province
 Thungsong dialect, spoken in the lower part of Nakhon Si Thammarat Province and surrounding provinces such as Phatthalung
 Songkhla dialect, spoken in Songkhla and surrounding provinces, except in Hat Yai District, where Central Thai with southern loanwords is spoken
 Syburi dialect, spoken in Syburi (Kedah), Palis and Satun Province

Southern Thai (Western) 
 Chaiya dialect, spoken in the northern part of Surat Thani Province and Ranong Province, classified as a dialect of the Peranakans
 Chumphon dialect, spoken in Chumphon Province and the southern part of Prachuap Khiri Khan Provinces
 Phuket dialect, spoken by Peranakans in Phuket Province, Krabi Province, Trang Province and Phang Nga Provinces
 Samui dialect, spoken in Samui District and Pha-ngan District

Takbai dialect 
 Takbai dialect, spoken by the Siamese minority in Patani

Distribution
In Thailand, speakers of Southern Thai can be found in a contiguous region beginning as far north as southern part of Prachuap Khiri Khan Province and extending southward to the border with Malaysia. Smaller numbers of speakers reside in the Malaysian border states, especially Kedah, Kelantan, Penang, Perlis, and Perak. In these areas, it is the primary language of ethnic Thais as well as of the ethnically Malay people on both sides of the Thai-Malaysian border in Satun and Songkhla provinces. Although numerous regional variations exist and there is no one standard, the language is most distinct near the Malaysian border. All varieties, however, remain mutually intelligible. For economic reasons, many speakers of Southern Thai have migrated to Bangkok and other Thai cities. Some have also emigrated to Malaysia, which offers not only economic opportunity but also a culture which shares the Islamic faith practiced by some speakers of Southern Thai.

History
Malay kingdoms ruled much of the Malay Peninsula, such as the Pattani Kingdom and Tambralinga, but most of the area, at one time or another, was under the rule of Srivijaya. The population of the Malay peninsula was heavily influenced by the culture of India transmitted through missionaries or indirectly through traders. Numerous Buddhist and Hindu shrines attest to the diffusion of Indian culture. The power vacuum left by the collapse of Srivijaya was filled by the growth of the kingdom of Nakhon Si Thammarat, which subsequently became a vassal of the Sukhothai Kingdom. The area has been a frontier between the northern Tai peoples and the southern ethnic Malays as well as between Buddhism and Islam.

Phonology

Dialects
Ligor dialect, spoken in Nakhon Si Thammarat, Phatthalung, Trang, Satun provinces and Mueang Pattani Kedah state, Mae Lan, Khok Pho and Nong Chik Districts of Pattani Province.
Chaiya dialect, spoken in Krabi, Phang Nga, Phuket, Ranong, Surat Thani and Chumphon Provinces.
Singora dialect, spoken in Songkhla, Yala and mostly part of Pattani Provinces.
Tak Bai dialect, spoken in Kelantan state, Narathiwat Province and Yaring, Panare, Sai Buri districts of Pattani Province.

Tones
The majority of speakers using Southern Thai varieties display five phonemic tones (tonemes) in citation monosyllables, although effects of sandhi can result in a substantially higher number of tonal allophones. This is true for dialects north of approximately 10° N and south of 7° N latitude, as well as urban sociolects throughout Southern Thailand. In between, there are dialects with six- and seven-tone systems. The dialect of Nakhon Si Thammarat Province (approximately centered on 8° N latitude) for example, has seven phonemic tones.

Initials

* In some dialects.
** Implied before any vowel without an initial and after a short vowel without a final
***ฃ and ฅ are no longer used. Thus, modern Thai is said to have 42 consonant letters.

Clusters
In Southern Thai, each syllable in a word is considered separate from the others, so combinations of consonants from adjacent syllables are never recognised as a cluster. Southern thai has phonotactical constraints that define permissible syllable structure, consonant clusters, and vowel sequences. Original Thai vocabulary introduces only 11 combined consonantal patterns:
  (กร),  (กล),  (กว)
  (ขร,คร),  (ขล,คล),  (ขว,คว)
  (ปร),  (ปล)
  (พร),  (ผล,พล)
  (ตร)

Finals
All plosive sounds are unreleased.

* The glottal stop appears at the end when no final follows a short vowel.

Vowels
The vowels of the Southern Thai are similar to those of Central Thai. They, from front to back and close to open, are given in the following table. The top entry in every cell is the symbol from the International Phonetic Alphabet, the second entry gives the spelling in the Thai alphabet, where a dash (–) indicates the position of the initial consonant after which the vowel is pronounced. A second dash indicates that a final consonant must follow.

The vowels each exist in long-short pairs: these are distinct phonemes forming unrelated words in Isan, but usually transliterated the same: เขา (khao) means "he/she", while ขาว (khao) means "white".

The long-short pairs are as follows:

The basic vowels can be combined into diphthongs.  For purposes of determining tone, those marked with an asterisk are sometimes classified as long:

Additionally, there are three triphthongs. For purposes of determining tone, those marked with an asterisk are sometimes classified as long:

Differences from Central Thai
Although of the major regional languages of Thailand, Southern Thai is most similar in lexicon and grammar to Central Thai, the varieties are sufficiently different that mutual intelligibility between the two can be problematic. Southern Thai presents a diglossic situation wherein registers range from the most formal (Standard Central Thai spoken with Southern Thai tones and accent) to the common vernacular (usually a contracted form of Thai expressions and with some amount of loan words from Malay). The Thai language was introduced with Siamese incursions into the Malay Peninsula possibly starting as early as the Sukhothai Kingdom. During this and successive kingdoms, the area in which Southern Thai is spoken was a frontier zone between Thai polities and the Malay Sultanates. Malay vocabulary has been absorbed into the lexicon, as a considerable number of Malay speakers lived in or near Patani polity and interacted with the Thai speakers through trade; and the Malay language was formerly considered to be a lingua franca of the southern part of the Malay peninsula.

Southern Thai is mainly a spoken language, although the Thai alphabet is often used in the informal situations when it is written.

The words used that are etymologically Thai are often spoken in a reduced and rapid manner, making comprehension by speakers of other varieties difficult.  Also, as Southern Thai uses up to seven tones in certain provinces, the tonal distribution is different from other regional varieties of Thai. Additionally, Southern Thai speakers almost always preserve ร as /r/ in contrast to Northern Thai, the Lao-based Isan language, and informal registers of Central Thai where it is generally realized as /l/.

References

Sources
 Bradley, David. (1992). "Southwestern Dai as a lingua franca." Atlas of Languages of Intercultural Communication in the Pacific, Asia, and the Americas. Vol. II.I:13, pp. 780–781.
 Levinson, David. Ethnic Groups Worldwide: A Ready Reference Handbook. Greenwood Publishing Group. ISPN: 1573560197.
 Miyaoka, Osahito. (2007). The Vanishing Languages of the Pacific Rim. Oxford University Press. .
 Taher, Mohamed. (1998). Encyclopaedic Survey of Islamic Culture. Anmol Publications Pvt. Ltd. .
 Yegar, Moshe. Between Integration and Secession: The Muslim Communities of the Southern Philippines, Southern Thailand, and Western Burma/Myanmar. Lexington Books. .
 Diller, A. Van Nostrand. (1976). Toward a Model of Southern Thai Diglossic Speech Variation. Cornell University Publishers.
 Li, Fang Kuei. (1977). A Handbook of Comparative Tai. University of Hawaii Press. .

External links

Southwestern Tai languages
Languages of Thailand
Languages of Malaysia
Languages of Myanmar
Malay Peninsula
Peninsular Malaysia
Southern Thailand